Hashemabad (also Romanized as Hāshemābād; also known as Qal‘eh Now-e Kāhū) is a village in Golmakan Rural District, Golbajar District, Chenaran County, Razavi Khorasan Province, Iran. At the 2006 census, its population was 302, in 77 families.

References 

Populated places in Chenaran County